Corro is a hamlet and council located in the municipality of Valdegovía/Gaubea, in Álava province, Basque Country, Spain. As of 2020, it has a population of 31.

Geography 
Corro is located 51km west of Vitoria-Gasteiz.

References

Populated places in Álava